The Sound of the Wide Open Spaces!!!! is the debut album by saxophonist/flautist James Clay and the second album by David "Fathead" Newman featuring performances recorded in 1960 and originally released on the Riverside label.

Reception

Scott Yanow of Allmusic says, "Cannonball Adderley supervised the session, putting the spotlight on the competitive horns who really battle it out". On All About Jazz, David Rickert wrote: "Neither Clay's or Newman's work apart from one another is anything to write home about, yet when paired together they managed to create an album that holds its own with the more consistent work of their peers".

Track listing
 "Wide Open Spaces" (Babs Gonzales) - 12:15  
 "They Can't Take That Away from Me" (George Gershwin, Ira Gershwin) - 6:34  
 "Some Kinda Mean" (Keter Betts) - 6:35  
 "What's New?" (Johnny Burke, Bob Haggart) - 5:46  
 "Figger-Ration" (Gonzales) - 8:51

Personnel
James Clay - tenor saxophone, flute
David "Fathead" Newman - tenor saxophone, alto saxophone
Wynton Kelly - piano
Sam Jones - bass
Art Taylor - drums

References

Riverside Records albums
James Clay (musician) albums
David "Fathead" Newman albums
1960 albums